Tetragonoderus foveicollis is a species of beetle in the family Carabidae. It was described by Liebke in 1951.

References

foveicollis
Beetles described in 1951